The 1998 Ball State Cardinals football team was an American football team that represented Ball State University in the West Division of the Mid-American Conference (MAC) during the 1998 NCAA Division I-A football season. In its fourth season under head coach Bill Lynch, the team compiled a 1–10 record (1–7 against conference opponents) and finished in sixth place out of six teams in the MAC West. The team played its home games at Ball State Stadium in Muncie, Indiana.

The team's statistical leaders included Clay Walters with 969 passing yards, LeAndre Moore with 909 rushing yards, Manuel Compas with 378 receiving yards, and Thomas Pucke with 28 points scored.

Schedule

References

Ball State
Ball State Cardinals football seasons
Ball State Cardinals football